Michel N'Gom (born Abdourhamane N'Gom; 25 June 1959 – 12 August 1984) was a professional footballer who played as a forward. Born in Senegal, he represented France at international level. He died at the age of 25 due to a traffic collision.

Early life 
Abdourhamane N'Gom was born on 25 June 1959 in Dakar, Senegal. He moved to France at the age of four with his mother, leaving his father and brother behind. He spent a large portion of his childhood in the Mazargues neighbourhood of Marseille, where he did his schooling and played as a youth player for AS Mazargues.

Club career

Marseille 
Having signed for the club in 1976 on a trainee contract, N'Gom made his first steps in the Division 1 with Marseille in 1977. In his debut season, he recorded 1 goal in 7 league matches. For the second season of his career, he was loaned to Division 2 side Toulon, where he gathered more experience, making 30 appearances and scoring 10 goals in all competitions. After his loan ended, he returned to Marseille, where he would play regularly for the next two seasons, scoring 25 more league goals in the process.

Paris Saint-Germain 
In 1981, N'Gom signed for fellow Division 1 club Paris Saint-Germain (PSG). There, he would win the Coupe de France in the 1981–82 and 1982–83 seasons. Across three seasons at PSG, N'Gom made 90 appearances, scoring 26 goals. He notably finished as the club's top goal-scorer in both the league and in all competitions in the 1983–84 season. He signed for Auxerre in July 1984.

International career 
N'Gom was an under-21 and amateur international for France. He played one match at the 1982 UEFA European Under-21 Championship.

Death 
N'Gom died on 12 August 1984 due to a traffic collision in the Auxerre suburb of Perrigny. He had only recently signed for the local club of Auxerre. The accident occurred at 1:45 PM on a Sunday, as N'Gom was driving on a straight road towards the entrance of Perrigny. He was driving back from Paris with a rented car, having taken advantage of several days of rest accorded by his new manager at Auxerre Guy Roux. Although the departmental road was without danger, he was surprised by a tractor that appeared in the middle of the way. A collision was inevitable, and the car hit an electricity pylon, leaving N'Gom instantly dead. The scene of the accident was only a couple of hundred meters away from his home.

Reactions 
The death of N'Gom brought about a reaction of great emotion in the world of football. PSG's president at the time Francis Borelli said "it is awful, I do not know what to say. I have enormous grief. It is a tragedy and I cannot believe it, Michel was a very nice boy. To find such a horrible death at the age of 25, it is terrible." All of Paris Saint-Germain's players were saddened by the news of N'Gom's passing. In 2010, Jean-Claude Lemoult spoke about when he heard the news; "I learned about his death while we were trying to do the souvenir photo of the France team after having won the gold medal at the Olympic Games in Los Angeles. It was a shock, impossible to smile for the cliché in such circumstances."

Funeral 
Several days after his death, his funeral took place in Conches. Players and staff of Paris Saint-Germain were present, and three Parisian players symbolically carried N'Gom's coffin.  Those players were Luis Fernandez, Dominique Rocheteau, and Boubacar Sarr. Borelli took the speaking role in honouring the memory of N'Gom.

Honours 
Paris Saint-Germain
 Coupe de France: 1981–82, 1982–83

References

External links 
 

1959 births
1984 deaths
Footballers from Dakar
Senegalese footballers
French footballers
French sportspeople of Senegalese descent
Senegalese emigrants to France
Naturalized citizens of France
Black French sportspeople
Association football forwards
Ligue 1 players
Ligue 2 players
Olympique de Marseille players
SC Toulon players
Paris Saint-Germain F.C. players
AJ Auxerre players
France youth international footballers
France under-21 international footballers
France amateur international footballers
Road incident deaths in France